General Harding may refer to:

Abner C. Harding (1807–1874), Illinois Volunteer Infantry brigadier general in the American Civil War
Edwin F. Harding (1886–1970), U.S. Army major general
Francis Pym Harding (1821–1875), British Army general
George Harding (British Army officer) (1788–1860), British Army lieutenant general
John Harding, 1st Baron Harding of Petherton (1896–1989), British Army 
Reginald Harding (1905–1981), British Army major general
Richard C. Harding (fl. 1970s–2010s), U.S. Air Force lieutenant general
Robert Harding (fl. 2000s–2010s), U.S. Army major general
William Giles Harding (1808–1886), Confederate States Army brigadier general

See also
Arthur Edward Hardinge (1828–1892), British Army general
Henry Hardinge, 1st Viscount Hardinge (1785–1856), British Army general
John J. Hardin (1810–1847), Illinois Militia major general
Martin Davis Hardin (1837–1923), Union Army brigadier general